American singer Katy Perry has released six studio albums, seven extended plays (EP), 39 singles (including four as featured artist), and 11 promotional singles. She is referred as the "Queen of Pop" of her time. According to Recording Industry Association of America, Perry has sold 109.5 million digital singles and 17 million albums in the United States. She is also the sixth best-selling digital singles artist in the United States. Throughout her career, Perry has sold 48 million album units and 135 million singles worldwide, making her one of the best-selling music artists of all time. Billboard listed her as the fourth top female artist of the 2010s decade (eighth overall) and the 61st greatest artist of all time. Perry has scored nine number one songs on Billboard Hot 100 and three number one albums on Billboard 200.

She currently holds the record for most 5-million-selling singles in the United States, with six of her singles selling over 5 million (in order of release date: "Hot n Cold", "California Gurls", "Firework", "E.T.", "Roar", and "Dark Horse"). Perry also holds the record for the most 6-million-selling songs, with three of her songs—"Firework", "Roar", and "Dark Horse"—selling over 6 million copies. All three have also received Diamond song certifications from the RIAA, making her the first artist to accomplish such a feat.

At age 16, she released a self-titled gospel album in March 2001 under her real name Katy Hudson, which failed to chart in any music market. After Perry signed with Capitol Records in April 2007, she released her second album, One of the Boys, in June 2008. Its singles "I Kissed a Girl" and "Hot n Cold" both topped charts in Austria, Canada, Germany, and Switzerland, and have been certified quintuple platinum by the RIAA. The album peaked within the top ten in the United States, Austria, Canada, France, Germany, and Switzerland. Throughout 2009 and 2010, Perry was featured on two singles. The first was on Colorado-based band 3OH!3's song "Starstrukk", and the second was a collaboration with Timbaland on "If We Ever Meet Again", from his album Shock Value II. Both singles reached the top ten in Australia and the United Kingdom while the latter topped the charts in New Zealand. Perry also performed for MTV Unplugged and a live album of the performance was released in November 2009.

Perry's third studio album Teenage Dream was released in August 2010 and topped the charts in the United States, Australia, Austria, Canada, New Zealand, and the United Kingdom. When its singles "California Gurls", "Teenage Dream", "Firework", "E.T.", and "Last Friday Night (T.G.I.F.)" topped the Billboard Hot 100, Perry became the first woman and only the second artist after Michael Jackson to attain five number-one singles in the United States from one album. The album was re-released in March 2012 as Teenage Dream: The Complete Confection. Its singles "Part of Me" and "Wide Awake" both reached number one in Canada and New Zealand. Her fourth studio album Prism was released in October 2013. Prism became an international success, reaching number one in Australia, Canada, New Zealand, United Kingdom, and the United States. Its singles "Roar" and "Dark Horse" both topped the charts in the United States and Canada. In the United Kingdom, "Roar" also became her second song after "Firework" to sell over one million copies. She subsequently released an anthem for the 2016 Summer Olympics titled "Rise", which debuted at number one in Australia. Perry's fifth album Witness followed in June 2017. It topped the charts in the United States and Canada. That year, she was also featured on Calvin Harris's song "Feels" from his album Funk Wav Bounces Vol. 1 along with Big Sean and Pharrell Williams, which reached number one in the United Kingdom. In 2018, she released the Christmas single "Cozy Little Christmas". This was followed by the release of the collaborations "Con Calma (Remix)" (with Daddy Yankee and Snow) and "365" (with Zedd). She released the non-album singles "Never Really Over", "Small Talk" and "Harleys in Hawaii" in 2019. Smile followed as her sixth album in August 2020.

Albums

Studio albums

Reissues

Extended plays

Singles

As lead artist

As featured artist

Promotional singles

Other charted or certified songs

Notes

References

Discography
Discographies of American artists
Pop music discographies